Larry R. Johnson (May 6, 1944 – July 30, 1998) was a noted meteorologist.

Biography
Johnson was graduate from the University of Wisconsin-Madison, with B.S. and M.S. degrees in meteorology.  For twenty-three years Johnson served in the United States Air Force Weather Agency, retiring as a lieutenant colonel. Johnson was a founding member of the National Weather Association, serving as its vice president in 1992 and its president in 1995.

He was born in 1944 and died from bone cancer in 1998. Johnson is buried at Arlington National Cemetery.

References

American meteorologists
United States Air Force officers
University of Wisconsin–Madison College of Letters and Science alumni
Burials at Arlington National Cemetery
1944 births
1998 deaths